UN Swahili Language Day is observed annually on 7 July. This began when the United Nations declared 7 July as Swahili Language Day in 2022. On 7 July 1954, Tanganyika African National Union (TANU) leader Julius Kambarage Nyerere, the eventual first President of Tanzania, adopted the Swahili Language as a unifying language for African independence struggles. Jomo Kenyatta, the first President of Kenya, followed suit and also used the Swahili language to mobilize and unify the people of Kenya in the struggle against colonialism through the use of the popular “Harambee” slogan.

The Swahili language is within the Niger-Congo language group and originated as a trade language amongst the people of the eastern African coast and the northern coast of Madagascar. Sixteen to twenty percent of the Swahili vocabulary are Arabic loanwords, including the name of the language (sawāḥilī, a plural adjectival form of an Arabic word meaning 'of the coast'). The loanwords date from contact with Arabic-speaking traders with the Bantu inhabitants of the east coast of Africa from the 1500's to European colonization. Swahili is currently a prominent language 
spoken in a variety of locations along the African Great Lakes Region and is spoken by upwards of 200 million people as a second language.

See also 
 International Mother Language Day
 International observance
 Official languages of the United Nations
 
 East African Community
 Southern African Development Community
 Baraza la Kiswahili la Taifa
 Chama cha Kiswahili cha Taifa
 African Great Lakes Region

 List of official languages
 List of official languages by institution
 List of languages by number of native speakers

References 

July observances
Swahili
Swahili language
Recurring events established in 2022
History of the United Nations
United Nations
United Nations
United Nations mass media
Official languages
Language policy in the United Nations